Ali Bahri Khomani (born 6 December 1951) is an Iranian boxer. He competed in the men's welterweight event at the 1976 Summer Olympics. At the 1976 Summer Olympics, he lost to Jochen Bachfeld of East Germany.

References

1951 births
Living people
Iranian male boxers
Olympic boxers of Iran
Boxers at the 1976 Summer Olympics
Place of birth missing (living people)
Welterweight boxers